"Wanna Be a Baller" is a single by American hip-hop artist Lil' Troy featuring Fat Pat, Yungstar, Lil' Will, Big T and H.A.W.K. It was released in 1998 as the second single from his debut major label studio album Sittin' Fat Down South. The song peaked at number 70 on the Billboard Hot 100 music chart.

Lil' Troy wrote but did not perform in the song.

The track features a chord pattern reminiscent of "Little Red Corvette" by Prince.

Legacy
This song has had a tragic legacy as almost everyone featured on this song has died at a relative early age. 
Fat Pat was murdered February 3, 1998, almost one year prior to the song's release. On May 1, 2006, Big Hawk, who filled in for his brother Fat Pat for the video shoot, was also murdered. Lil' Troy's cousin Lil' Will died in a car accident in February 2016. Big T, who contributed vocals for the song's hook, died May 8, 2018 of a suspected heart attack.

Yungstar, a Houston-area mixtape legend, and Lil Troy are the only survivors, with Yungstar still active performing and featuring on other artist's songs while Lil Troy became a truck driver, forming Birklett Trucking Company.

The song is featured on the soundtrack of NBA 2K19, which was curated by rapper Travis Scott.

Charts

Peak positions

References

1999 singles
1999 songs
Uptown Records singles